Jörg Roßkopf (born May 22, 1969 in Dieburg, Hesse) is a former professional German table tennis player who is currently the head coach of the German Men's National Table Tennis Team. As a player, he won the title in Men's Doubles at the 1989 World Table Tennis Championships and the silver medal at the 1992 Summer Olympics in Barcelona, with Steffen Fetzner as his partner. In men's singles, he won the bronze medal at the 1996 Summer Olympics in Atlanta and the gold medal at the Table Tennis World Cup in 1998. As a coach, he was awarded the ITTF Star Coach award in 2017.

Jan-Ove Waldner considered him to have the best backhand in the world, particularly against backspin.

He is one of seven table tennis players to have competed in the first five Olympics since the sport was introduced to the Games in 1988. The others are Swede Jörgen Persson, Croatian Zoran Primorac, Belgian Jean-Michel Saive, Hungarian Csilla Bátorfi, Serbian-American Ilija Lupulesku, and Swede Jan-Ove Waldner.

He is sponsored by JOOLA Table Tennis.

Outstanding career stages

1998 – European Champion doubles Eindhoven
1998 – Winner of the World Cup singles Shantou
1996 – 3rd singles Olympic Games Atlanta
1992 – European Champion singles Stuttgart
1992 – 2nd doubles Olympic Games Barcelona
1989 – World Champion doubles with Steffen Fetzner Dortmund

See also
List of athletes with the most appearances at Olympic Games

References

1969 births
Living people
People from Dieburg
Sportspeople from Darmstadt (region)
German male table tennis players
Olympic table tennis players of West Germany
Olympic table tennis players of Germany
Table tennis players at the 1988 Summer Olympics
Table tennis players at the 1992 Summer Olympics
Table tennis players at the 1996 Summer Olympics
Table tennis players at the 2000 Summer Olympics
Table tennis players at the 2004 Summer Olympics
Olympic silver medalists for Germany
Olympic bronze medalists for Germany
Olympic medalists in table tennis
German table tennis coaches
Medalists at the 1996 Summer Olympics
Medalists at the 1992 Summer Olympics